Pontiac is an unincorporated community in Richland County, South Carolina, United States.

Pontiac is the location of Pontiac Foods, a coffee, spice, rice and beans plant owned by The Kroger Company.  Pontiac Foods has been in Pontiac for over 30 years and employs over 250 full-time associates.

Spring Valley High School and Pontiac Elementary School are located in Pontiac.

References

Unincorporated communities in Richland County, South Carolina
Columbia metropolitan area (South Carolina)
Unincorporated communities in South Carolina